The 1917–18 Luxembourg National Division was the 8th season of top level association football in Luxembourg.

Overview
It was contested by 6 teams, and CS Fola Esch won the championship.

League standings

Results

References
Luxembourg - List of final tables (RSSSF)

1917-18
1917–18 in European association football leagues
Nat